Siti Shahrizah "Eja" Saifuddin (born 18 January 1972) is a Malaysian actress of television and film. She first gained fame as the co-host in Roda Impian, the Malaysian version of Wheel of Fortune. After leaving the game show, she hosted a number of TV shows and became an actress through a number of drama series.

Early life
Eja was born and raised in Kuala Kubu Baru, Selangor, she was the daughter of a marine police officer. She initially took a secretarial course after finishing form five, before deciding to join the Malaysia Airlines ( MAS ) as a flight attendant. After six years later, she ventured into acting career. In 1997, she got offered to host a variety of music programs on TV3, Video Skop.

Filmography

Film

Television 
 Ejen 88 & 44
 Rahsia Demi Rahsia
 Teduh Kabus
 Salam Taj Mahal (2000)
 Kiranya Ku Tahu (2000)
 Takhta Hati
 Tiga Dara - Tan, Tin Tun
 Rindu Semakin Jauh (2004)
 Kalau Itu Takdirnya (2004)
 Masih Ada Cinta
 Wajah Kekasih
 Cinta Semerbak Kayu Manis
 Mya Zara (2006)
 Seputih Qaseh Ramadan
 Sadiq & Co
 Telefilem Rantai (2016)

Drama 
 Dimata Mu Aku
 Dijiwa Mu Dia (2002)
 Pembunuh Upahan (2003)
 Igawan (2004)
 Syawal (2005)
 Cahaya Hati
 Sangga Saadah
 Talkin Terakhir 
 Wadi Unung (2009)
 Satu Permintaan (2011)

Awards and nominations

Malaysia Film Festival

ABPBH Awards

Skrin Awards

References
 interview
 http://www.murai.com.my/article/default.asp?article_id=14803&c=1&s=1

External links
 

1972 births
Living people
Malaysian people of Malay descent
Malaysian Muslims
Malaysian actresses
Malaysian television actresses
Malaysian film actresses
Malaysian television personalities
People from Selangor